Suzanne Palmer is an American science fiction writer known for her novelette "The Secret Life of Bots", which won a Hugo Award in 2018. The story also won a Washington Science Fiction Association Small Press Award and was a finalist for the Theodore Sturgeon Memorial Award.

Palmer has a Bachelor's of Fine Arts degree from the University of Massachusetts at Amherst. She was the head librarian of the UMass Science Fiction Society. She lives in Massachusetts, where she works as a system administrator at Smith College.

She has been publishing short fiction and poetry since 2005. She cites John Scalzi, Elizabeth Bear, Karl Schroeder, and Martha Wells as some of her influences and describes her primary genre as "space opera-style science fiction". She moderates the SFF room on the AbsoluteWrite forums using her online name zanzjan.

Her first full-length novel, Finder, a thriller about an interstellar repo man, was published by DAW Books in 2019. She has since published two more novels in that series: Driving the Deep and The Scavenger Door.

In 2020, Palmer won the Theodore Sturgeon Memorial Award for her story "Waterlines".

Bibliography

Finder Chronicles

Short stories
 "The Ins and Outs of Intergalactic Diplomacy" (2005) (published in Andromeda Spaceways Inflight Magazine #20)
 "He's Got Skeleteons" (2006) (published in Aoife's Kiss webzine)
 "Spheres" (2006) (published in Interzone #207)
 "The Neighborly Thing" (2007) (published in Andromeda Spaceways Inflight Magazine #31)
 "Concession Girl" (2008) (published in Interzone #217)
 "Silence and Roses" (2009) (published in Interzone #223)
 "Zombie Cabana Boy" (2010) (published in Black Static #17)
 "The Ceiling Is Sky" (2011) (published in Interzone #234)
 "By the Time I Get to Phoenix" (2011) (published in Comets and Criminals #1)
 "Surf" (2011) (published in Asimov's Science Fiction)
 "Two for the Starry Night" (2012) (published in Comets and Criminals #2)
 "Adware" (2012) (published in Asimov's Science Fiction)
 "Tangerine, Nectarine, Clementine, Apocalypse" (2012) (published in Interzone #239)
 "Hotel" (2013) (published in Asimov's Science Fiction)
 "Fly Away Home" (2014) (published in Interzone #251)
 "House Party Blues" (2014) (published in Black Static #39)
 "Shatterdown" (2014) (published in Asimov's Science Fiction)
 "Tuesdays" (2015) (published in Asimov's Science Fiction)
 "Moogh and the Great Trench Kraken" (2015) (published in Beneath Ceaseless Skies #181)
 "Lazy Dog Out" (2016) (published in Asimov's Science Fiction)
 "Ten Poems for the Mossums, One for the Man" (2016) (published in Asimov's Science Fiction)
 "Detroit Hammersmith, Zero Gravity Toilet Repairman (Retired)" (2016) (published in Analog Science Fiction and Fact)
 "Belong" (2016) (published in Interzone #265)
 "Number Thirty-Nine Skink" (2017) (published in Asimov's Science Fiction)
 "Books of the Risen Sea" (2017) (published in Asimov's Science Fiction)
 "The Secret Life of Bots" (2017) (published in Clarkesworld Magazine #132)
 "The Streaming Man" (2018) (published in Analog Science Fiction and Fact)
 "Stones in the Water, Cottage on the Mountain" (2018) (published in Asimov's Science Fiction)
 "R.U.R-8?" (2018) (published in Asimov's Science Fiction)
 "Thirty-Three Percent Joe" (2018) (published in Clarkesworld Magazine #145)
 "Taking Icarus Home" (2019) (published in Asimov's Science Fiction)
 "The Painter of Trees" (2019) (published in Clarkesworld Magazine #153)
 "Waterlines" (2019) (published in Asimov's Science Fiction)
 "Dave's Head" (2019) (published in Clarkesworld Magazine #156)
 "Table Etiquette for Diplomatic Personnel, in Seventeen Scenes" (2021) (published in Asimov's Science Fiction)
 "Bots of the Lost Ark" (2021) (published in Clarkesworld Magazine #171)

Awards

References

External links
 
 

Living people
21st-century American women writers
Hugo Award-winning writers
Women science fiction and fantasy writers
Year of birth missing (living people)